Scutellastra argenvillei or Argenville's limpet, is a species of sea snail, a true limpet, a marine gastropod mollusk in the family Patellidae, one of the families of true limpets.

It is endemic to the south and west coasts of Namibia and South Africa in southern Africa.

Description
It is a large and relatively tall limpet, with an oval base, slightly narrower at one end, with a maximum size of about 90 mm. The outer surface has fine radiating ridges, and the apex is commonly eroded. Inner surface is generally white.

Ecology
This limpet is abundant on moderately exposed shores in the low inter-tidal and shallow subtidal zone on the west coast of South Africa, but is being displaced by the invasive Mediterranean mussel Mytilus galloprovincialis. The lower inter-tidal zone in this area is also referred to as the Cochlear-Argenvillei zone. It feeds on kelp by trapping the edge of fronds under the edge of its shell while feeding.

References

 Kilburn, R.N. & Rippey, E. (1982) Sea Shells of Southern Africa. Macmillan South Africa, Johannesburg, xi + 249 pp. page(s): 37
 Koufopanou et al. (1999). A molecular phylogeny of the patellid limpets (Gastropoda: Patellidae) and its implications for the origins of their antitropical distribution Mol. Phylogenet. Evol. 11(1):138-156 
  Branch, G.M. et al. (2002). Two Oceans. 5th impression. David Philip, Cate Town & Johannesburg
 Nakano & Ozawa (2007). Worldwide phylogeography of limpets of the order Patellogastropoda: Molecular, morphological and palaeontological evidence. Journal of Molluscan Studies 73(1) 79–99.

Patellidae
Gastropods described in 1848
Taxa named by Christian Ferdinand Friedrich Krauss